Wessex was an Anglo-Saxon kingdom in early medieval England.

Wessex or West Saxon may also refer to:
Wessex Archaeology, an educational charity and the largest UK archaeological practice,
Wessex culture, a name given to the predominant prehistoric culture of southern Britain during the early Bronze Age
Early West Saxon, the Germanic dialect spoken by the West Saxons following Anglo-Saxon settlement
Late West Saxon, the language usually known as Old English
Thomas Hardy's Wessex, a semi-fictional region of England in the novels of Thomas Hardy
Westland Wessex, a helicopter
Earl of Wessex, an English title of nobility
James, Earl of Wessex, the son of the Duke and Duchess of Edinburgh, grandson of Elizabeth II and nephew of Charles III
Wessex (European Parliament constituency), a former constituency covering Dorset and part of Hampshire and Wiltshire
Wessex, Ontario, Canada, a fictitious city in the Canadian sitcom Dan for Mayor
Wessex Formation, an English fossil site and geological formation
Wessex RFC, a rugby union team in Devon, England
Wessex League, football league covering Hampshire and parts of the surrounding counties
The Wessex Institute of Technology
Wessex Stadium, home to Weymouth F.C.
The 43rd (Wessex) Brigade, British Army's regional command for the South West region
The Royal Wessex Yeomanry, a British Army territorial unit
Wessex Sound Studios, a renowned former recording studio, in Highbury, London
Wessex Trains, train operating company that used to operate in much of the South West region
Wessex Water, water supply and sewage company that covers much of the South West region
The Wessex Rangers
Wessex Scene, a student newspaper produced by Southampton University Students' Union (SUSU)
Wessex Saddleback, a pig breed originating from Wessex
The Wessex Way, a trunk road linking Bournemouth to the A31 and leading to Salisbury
Wessex, a community that is a part of Morningside Place in Houston
, the name of more than one ship of the British Royal Navy
Wessex (ward), an electoral ward in Somerset, England

See also
Wizex, a Swedish dansband